Motutakapu is a rugged islet in the Hauraki Gulf of New Zealand, lying some 5 km off the west coast of the Coromandel Peninsula.  Only 120 m long by 60 m wide, it is home to a breeding colony of Australasian gannets and has been identified as an Important Bird Area by BirdLife International.  Surveys of breeding gannets there in the mid-20th century showed an increase from about 200 pairs in 1928 to 400 pairs in 1947, while the BirdLife assessment was based on 1980-1981 surveys showing about 4500 pairs.

See also

 Desert island
 List of islands

References

Uninhabited islands of New Zealand
Islands of the Hauraki Gulf
Seabird colonies
Important Bird Areas of New Zealand
Thames-Coromandel District
Landforms of Waikato